Selvin Bonifacio Zepeda Morales (born 13 July 1981 in San Sebastián) is a Salvadoran football player who represented El Salvador at international level.

Club career
Zepeda started his career at Santa Clara in 1998 before joining ADET in 2000. In 2002, he moved to newly formed San Salvador F.C. and stayed with them until they disbanded in 2008. After a season at FAS he signed for Nejapa, later renamed Alacranes Del Norte.

International career
Zepeda made his debut for El Salvador in a January 2008 friendly match against Haiti but has not featured in the national side since.

References

External links
 

1981 births
Living people
People from San Vicente Department
Association football defenders
Salvadoran footballers
El Salvador international footballers
San Salvador F.C. footballers
C.D. FAS footballers
Nejapa footballers